SCIA may refer to:
 Scandinavian Conference on Image Analysis
 Spinal Cord Injuries Australia
 Software change impact analysis
 United States Senate Committee on Indian Affairs
The Sky Crawlers: Innocent Aces, an air combat video game
 Shenzhen Court of International Arbitration